Galante was a Jewish family which flourished at the beginning of the 16th century in Rome, and the head of which, Mordecai, was a Spanish exile of the Angel family. His courteous manners won for him from the Roman nobles the surname "Galantuomo" (gentleman), a name which the family retained. About this time the family settled in Palestine, where it produced authors and other celebrities, among them the following:
 Abraham ben Mordecai Galante - (d. 1560, Italian kabbalist)
 Moses ben Mordecai Galante - (d. 1608, Safed)
 Jonathan ben Moses Galante - (17th-century rabbi at Safed)
 Moses ben Jonathan Galante - (1621 – 1689, Jerusalem), was the first Rishon LeZion (Sephardic chief Rabbi of Israel).
 Mordecai Galante - (d. 1781, chief rabbi of Damascus)
 Moses Galante - (d. 1806, chief rabbi of Damascus)

References 

Sephardi families
Jewish families
Jewish Roman (city) history
People of Spanish-Jewish descent